William Romaine Paterson (29 July 1871, Glasgow —1942) was a Scottish, Glasgow-based writer often using the pen name Benjamin Swift. He wrote novels, poems, essays, and short stories.

Works
Nancy Noon, 1896
The Tormentor, 1897
The Destroyer, 1898
Dartnell: A Bizarre Incident, 1900
Nude Souls, a novel, 1900
The Eternal Conflict, an essay, 1901,  228pp.
Ludus amoris, reprinted as The Game of Love, 1902
In Piccadilly, 1903
Gossip, 1905
Life's questionings: A book of experience, a collection of author's aphorisms and apothegms 1905
The Nemesis Of Nations: Studies In History, 1907
 From the preface: "...a humble attempt is made to utilise part of the expert evidence for the purpose of forming some opinions on the life and death of nations." Chapters: I. Introduction, II. Hindustan, III. Babylon, IV. Greece, V. Rome.
The Death Man, 1908
The Lady of the Night, 1913
What Lies Beneath, 1917
Siren City, 1923
The Old Dance Master, 1923
Problems of Destiny, an essay, 1935

Biographical details
He lived as 25 University Gardens near the University of Glasgow.

He received the MA degree (1894) from the University of Glasgow.

His mother was Marion Paterson. His father was  Robert Paterson. His sister, Catherine Paterson,  gifted  part his archive to University of Glasgow Special Collections. He also had brother, James Venn Paterson and a nephew  James Paterson, Doctor of Laws.

He was interred in Vichy, France.

References

External links
"Material relating to William Romaine Paterson", University of Glasgow, Special Collections

1871 births
1942 deaths
Scottish writers